Ilocos-Central Luzon Basin is a sedimentary basin and stratigraphic formation in the Ilocos Region and Central Luzon Region, Philippines.

Stratigraphic groupings

Ilocos 

 Suyo Schist - greenschist, serpentinite, chert

 Ilocos Peridotite - serpentinized peridotite
 Bangui Formation - sandstone, conglomerate, mudstone; includes olistostrome
 Magabobbo Limestone - micritic limestone, calcarenites, minor argillites
 Bojeador Formation - conglomerate, graywacke, shale, limestone and associated volcanic flows and pyroclastics
 Pasaleng Quartz Diorite
 Dagot Limestone - reefal limestone, calcarenites, biosparites, minor calcareous volcanic conglomerate, particularly at the base and middle section
 Batac Formation - thinly bedded sandstone and shale; conglomerate
 Pasuquin Limestone - limestone with minor calcareous conglomerate, calcirudite, calcarenite
 Uplifted Coral Reefs

Luzon Central Valley

West side 

 Aksitero Formation - Lower Bigbiga Limestone – micritic limestone with tuffaceous turbidites and minor chert; Upper Burgos Member – Limestone, tuffaceous sandstone, siltstone and mudstone. This is coequival with Bigbiga Limestone.
 Moriones Formation - interbedded sandstone, shale, conglomerate with minor limestone; identified members are Sansotero Limestone and Malo Pungatan Limestone
 Malinta Formation - Lower Pau Sandstone – sandstones with minor tuffaceous shale, conglomerates and lapilli tuff; Upper Aparri Gorge Sandstone – sandstones with shale stringers and conglomerate lenses
 Tarlac Formation - interbedded sandstone, shale, conglomerate
 Amlang Formation - turbiditic sandstones and shale with minor conglomerates
 Cataguintingan Formation - mainly tuffaceous sandstones, with interbeds of siltstones, shales and conglomerate and minor limestone lenses
 Bamban Formation - tuffaceous sandstone and lapilli tuff with basal conglomerate.
 Damortis Formation - sandstone, calcarenite, siltstone, limestone and marl

East side 

 Barenas-Baito Formation
 Bayabas Formation
 Angat Formation
 Madlum Formation
 Makapilapil Formation
 Lambak Formation
 Tartaro Formation
 Guadalupe Formation

See also 
List of stratigraphic formations in the Philippines

References 

Stratigraphy
Sedimentary basins of Asia